St Matthew's Church, Northampton is a Church of England parish church in Northampton, within the Diocese of Peterborough.

The church is a Grade II* listed building.  It was erected (1891–4) in memory of brewer and MP, Pickering Phipps, beside the Kettering Road. The architect was Matthew Holding.

Canon John Rowden Hussey was vicar from its consecration in 1893 to 1937. Walter Hussey, vicar from 1937 to 1955 succeeding his father, was a patron of the arts. He celebrated the church's 50th anniversary with a sequence of events and commissions: the commission of the anthem Rejoice in the Lamb from Benjamin Britten; a performance from the BBC Symphony Orchestra (2 October 1943); an organ recital by George Thalben-Ball, and  the commission of Henry Moore's sculpture "Madonna and Child".

Buoyed by the success of the 1943-4 commissions, Hussey continued to commission new works of art.  Other musical commissions included The Revival by Edmund Rubbra (1944); Festival Anthem by Lennox Berkeley (1945), Lo, the full, final sacrifice from Gerald Finzi (1946), and works by Christopher Headington, Malcolm Arnold and others. There were commissions of poetry: a Litany and Anthem for St Matthew's Day from W. H. Auden and The Outer Planet from Norman Nicholson. The recitals continued throughout this time, most notably with two concerts by the singer Kirsten Flagstad

In the north transept is Henry Moore's stone sculpture, "Madonna and Child" (1944) and in the south transept a painting of the Crucifixion (1946) by Graham Sutherland. The triptych in the Lady Chapel is by C. E. Buckeridge. A 2009 addition is a bronze statue of St Matthew by Ian Rank-Broadley.

A 1956 oil and watercolour painting of St Matthew's Church by John Piper is in the collection of the Northampton Museum and Art Gallery.

Liturgy

St Matthew's follows an Anglican service with Catholic traits. The church celebrates two Eucharistic services on a Sunday including a Parish Mass at 10.15am which is Choral on Feast Days. The Parish Mass is pro populo on the nave altar and the lectern has recently been moved from the chancel step to the high altar to make way for a traditional statue of St Matthew.  Choral Evensong is sung twice a month with Benediction following the service on the third Sunday of each. The church maintains a daily Eucharist service and has done since its founding in 1893. The Daily Offices of Morning and Evening Prayer are also said publicly every day of the year.

Music

For many years St Matthew's had an all-male choir which was disbanded in the early 2000s. The choir now consists of girl and boy choristers aged 8–18 and adult Altos, Tenors and Basses who sing two services each Sunday. The church choir is supported by The St Matthew's Singers, a choir of local amateur singers, who sing Choral Mass on mid-week Feast Days. The whole music department is overseen by a Director of Music, Parish Organist and Organ Scholar.

The choir has undertaken a tour each year since 2012. These have included week-long trips to sing at St Davids (2012), Portsmouth (2013), Carlisle (2014), Exeter (2015) and Chester (2016), Ely (2017) and Germany (2018). The choir has released two CDs in recent years; in 2013 a disc of music for Advent and Christmas, and in 2014 a recording including recent commissions from David Bednall, David Halls and Philip Stopford.

St Matthew's is also a concert venue for Northampton. The church is home to the Northampton Bach Choir, founded by Denys Pouncey in 1935, which for many years had St Matthew's Director of Music as its Director. The church also has links with the Northampton Music and Performing Arts Trust, the Northampton Philharmonic Choir, the Northampton Chamber Choir and many other groups. St Matthew's also houses a manual organ built by J. W. Walker & Sons Ltd in 1895.  Regular organ recitals take place.

List of organists

Many of the previous St Matthew's Directors of Music have gone on to hold important positions in Church Music.  These have included King's College, Cambridge, Wells Cathedral, Norwich Cathedral, Blackburn Cathedral, Llandaff Cathedral, York Minster, and the Cathedral of Saint John the Divine, New York City. 
 
Charles J. King 1895 – 1934
Philip Pfaff 1930 – 1934
Denys Pouncey 1934 – 1936
Alec Wyton 1946 – 1950
Robert Henry Joyce 1950 – 1958
John Bertalot 1958 – 1964
Michael Nicholas 1964 – 1971
Stephen Cleobury 1971 – 1974
 Timothy Day 1974 – 1976
 David Ponsford 1976 – 1979
 Derek Gillard 1979 – 1985
 Andrew Shenton 1986 – 91
 Andrew King 1991 – 1998
 Ian Frank Clarke 1998 – 2001
 John Malcolm Tyler 2001 – 2004 (Music Coordinator)
 Jonathan Starmer (Acting Director of Music) January – September 2005
 Sebastian Thomson 2005 – 2009
 Ben Horden 2009 – 2010
 Jonathan Starmer & Ben Drouet (Acting Directors of Music) September – December 2010
 Stephen Moore 2010 – 2016
 Simon Toyne (Acting Director of Music) September – December 2016
 Justin Miller 2017 – 2022

Musical commissions

A list of musical commissions of St Matthew's Church is here below:

 1943 – Benjamin Britten – Rejoice in the Lamb
 1943 – Michael Tippett – Fanfare No 1 for 10 Brass Instruments
 1944 – Edmund Rubbra – The Revival
 1945 – Lennox Berkeley – Festival Anthem
 1946 – Gerald Finzi – Lo, the full, final sacrifice
 1946 – Benjamin Britten – Prelude and Fugue on a Theme of Vittoria
 1948 – Christopher Headington – Festival Anthem: Supreme Bliss
 1949 – John Rose – Festival Hymn
 1950 – Malcolm Arnold – Laudate Dominum
 1954 – James Butt – Bless the Lord
 1956 – David Barlow – Who shall ascend the hill of the Lord
 1958 – George Dyson – Hail universal Lord
 1959 – Elizabeth Poston – Festal Te Deum
 1960 – Peter Dickinson – Justus Quidem Tu Es, Domine
 1962 – Brian Judge – Ambrosian Prayer
 1964 – Christopher Le Fleming – Communion Service in D
 1965 – Kenneth Leighton – Let all the world in every corner sing
 1966 – John McCabe – A Hymne to God the Father
 1967 – Richard Rodney Bennett – Five Christmas Carols
 1968 – Gordon Crosse – The Covenant of the Rainbow
 1968 – Herbert Howells – One thing have I desired of the Lord
 1968 – Robert Walker – Fanfare
 1973 – William Mathias – Missa Brevis
 1977 – Sebastian Forbes – Quam Dilecta
 1983 – Philip Moore – At the round earth's imagined corners
 1986 – Herbert Sumsion – The spacious firmament on high
 1987 – Geoffrey Burgon – The song of the creatures
 1988 – John Tavener – The Call
 1988 – Simon Lole – Carol for Advent
 1989 – Richard Shephard – St Matthew's Mass
 1989 – Alan Ridout – Toccata
 1989 – Ivan Moody – Canticle of Simeoon
 1990 – Paul Edwards – God that madest heaven and earth
 1990 – Trevor Hold – Verses from St Matthew
 1991 – Alec Wyton – A Prayer for Church Musicians and Artists
 1993 – Diana Burrell – Heil'ger Geist in's Himmels Throne
 2008 – David Briggs – Toccata for St Matthew's Day
 2009 – David Bednall – The Walter Hussey Centenary Mass (with motet, Aspire to God, my soul)
 2012 – Paul Mealor – How beautiful on the mountains
 2013 – David Halls – Mass of the Altar of Life (with motet, This is the Day)
 2014 – Philip Stopford – O how glorious is the Kingdom
 2016 – Simon Johnson – Behold, the tabernacle of God
 2016 – David Maw – Allein nach dir, Herr (part of the Orgelbüchlein Project)
 2017 – James Davy – Introit for a Feast Day
 2017 – James Whitbourn – Beatus vir	
 2018 – Grayston Ives – All people that on earth do dwell	
 2020 – Robert Walker – A Little Organ Mass of the Angels

References

External links

Mystery Worshipper Report, 2009

St Matthew's Church
Grade II* listed churches in Northamptonshire
Anglo-Catholic church buildings in Northamptonshire
19th-century Church of England church buildings
Churches completed in 1894